Vladimira (Mira) Ieronimowna Uborevich (14 February 1924, Chita - 21 February 2020, Moscow) was a Russian architect and author of memoirs, describing her experiences as a child of an enemy of the people.

Life 
In 1930, her family moved to Moscow.  In 1937, her father Ieronim Uborevich, a prominent Soviet military commander, was arrested  and executed, together with Mikhail Tukhachevsky , Iona Yakir and August Kork. She was a friend of Mikhail Bulgakov's wife, Elena Sergeevna Bulgakova. The family was exiled to Astrakhan, and after her mother Nina was arrested, Vladimira was moved to an orphanage in Sverdlovsk. She studied at the Moscow Architectural Institute. In 1944 Mira was arrested, convicted and sent to the Vorkutlag camp. She was rehabilitated, and graduated from Moscow State University of Civil Engineering.  She worked at  Zentromasch. In 1960s at a request of Elena Bulgakova, she wrote a number of letters, remembering her childhood and later experiences. 

In January 2013,  a multi-part documentary program, about her, by Vladimir Meletin, was shown on Russia-K.

Works 

 14 писем Елене Сергеевне Булгаковой / 14 pisem Elene Sergeevne Bulgakovoĭ Время, Moskva : Vremi︠a︡, 2008.

References 

1924 births
2020 deaths
Russian architects
Soviet architects
Russian women architects
Moscow Architectural Institute alumni